Presho is a small city in Lyman County, South Dakota, United States. The population was 472 at the 2020 census.

History
Presho was laid out in 1905, and named in honor of J. S. Presho, a cattleman.

Geography
Presho is located at  (43.905960, -100.058068).

Presho has been assigned the ZIP code 57568 and the FIPS place code 51820.

Demographics

2010 census
As of the census of 2010, there were 497 people, 232 households, and 136 families residing in the city. The racial makeup of the city was 95.8% White, 2.4% Native American, 0.2% from other races, and 1.6% from two or more races. Hispanic or Latino of any race were 0.2% of the population.

There were 232 households, of which 24.6% had children under the age of 18 living with them, 46.6% were married couples living together, 7.8% had a female householder with no husband present, 4.3% had a male householder with no wife present, and 41.4% were non-families. 39.2% of all households were made up of individuals, and 15.5% had someone living alone who was 65 years of age or older. The average household size was 2.14 and the average family size was 2.88.

The median age in the city was 46.5 years. 22.7% of residents were under the age of 18; 5.9% were between the ages of 18 and 24; 18.8% were from 25 to 44; 32.2% were from 45 to 64; and 20.1% were 65 years of age or older. The gender makeup of the city was 51.3% male and 48.7% female.

2000 census
As of the census of 2000, there were 588 people, 251 households, and 169 families residing in the city. The population density was 901.0 people per square mile (349.3/km2). There were 305 housing units at an average density of 467.4 per square mile (181.2/km2). The racial makeup of the city was 96.09% White, 0.34% African American, 1.36% Native American, 0.85% Asian, and 1.36% from two or more races. Hispanic or Latino of any race were 0.68% of the population.

There were 251 households, out of which 33.9% had children under the age of 18 living with them, 53.0% were married couples living together, 9.6% had a female householder with no husband present, and 32.3% were non-families. 29.9% of all households were made up of individuals, and 16.7% had someone living alone who was 65 years of age or older. The average household size was 2.34 and the average family size was 2.90.

In the city, the population was spread out, with 26.2% under the age of 18, 6.0% from 18 to 24, 26.4% from 25 to 44, 21.1% from 45 to 64, and 20.4% who were 65 years of age or older. The median age was 41 years. For every 100 females, there were 111.5 males. For every 100 females age 18 and over, there were 102.8 males.

The median income for a household in the city was $30,893, and the median income for a family was $38,250. Males had a median income of $22,500 versus $17,250 for females. The per capita income for the city was $15,789. About 11.2% of families and 11.2% of the population were below the poverty line, including 13.5% of those under age 18 and 15.8% of those age 65 or over.

Notable person
 Clint Roberts - United States Congressman for South Dakota's 2nd congressional district from 1981 to 1983.
  Dale E. Wagoner- Caterpillar Tractor, Wagoner's Mini Tack

References

Cities in Lyman County, South Dakota
Cities in South Dakota
Populated places established in 1910
1910 establishments in South Dakota